Michael Williams is a Canadian television personality who may be best known for his work as a VJ at MuchMusic from 1984 to 1993.  Born in Cleveland, Ohio,  Williams moved to Montreal in the 1970s to attend the Communications Arts School at Loyola (now Concordia University).

Williams was part of MuchMusic's core opening team of VJ's alongside J. D. Roberts, Erica Ehm, Christopher Ward, and Denise Donlon.  At MuchMusic, Williams hosted various shows including Soul in the City, RapCity, Electric Circus, Pepsi Power Hour and The NewMusic.

He was recently a radio personality in Hamilton, Ontario as host of the program College of Musical Knowledge on Wave 94.7 . Previous radio work included Montreal's CHOM-FM and CKGM-AM, and in Toronto at CHUM-FM. Williams also owns Black Rose Recording Studios in Toronto and since , he has been teaching.  Williams also works as an occasional fill-in host on Newstalk 1010 in Toronto.

Williams is a regular on-air contributor to CTV News's entertainment segment "Noteworthy".

References

External links
 The Ruckus - Audio Interview with Michael Williams from December 2008

Black Canadian broadcasters
Canadian radio personalities
Much (TV channel) personalities
Year of birth missing (living people)
Living people
Place of birth missing (living people)
People from Cleveland
Canadian VJs (media personalities)